Juan Reyes may refer to:

 Juan Francisco Reyes (1938–2019), Vice President of Guatemala, 2000–2004
 Juan Francisco Reyes (soldier) (1749–1809), Spanish soldier and colonial politician
 Juan D. Reyes (born 1968), Republican politician and attorney in New York City
 Juan Ignacio Reyes (born 1981), Paralympic swimmer
 Juan Pablo Reyes (born 1985), Ecuadorian footballer
 Juan Carlos Reyes (governor) (died 2007), de facto Federal Interventor of Córdoba, Argentina, 1970
 Juan Carlos Reyes (footballer) (born 1976), retired Uruguayan footballer
 Juan Reyes (cyclist) (born 1944), Cuban Olympic cyclist